Michael Cherry may refer to:

Michael Cherry (judge) (born 1944), American judge
Michael Cherry (athlete) (born 1995), American track sprinter

See also
Mike Cherry (disambiguation)